is a football stadium in Hirono, Fukushima and Naraha, Fukushima, Japan.

It was one of the home stadium of football club TEPCO Mareeze. It was used J2 League game between Montedio Yamagata and Shonan Bellmare on April 16, 2005.

J-Village complex became the front line base for the nuclear accidents and it is back in normal use as the sports facilities now. 

In 2022, the J. League authorized Iwaki FC to use the stadium as its home ground in preparation for their promotion to J2 League as champions of J3 League.

See also
 J-Village Station

References

External links
 Official site

Sports venues in Fukushima Prefecture
Football venues in Japan
Fukushima Daiichi nuclear disaster
Hirono, Fukushima
Naraha, Fukushima
Sports venues completed in 1993
1993 establishments in Japan
Iwaki FC
Fukushima United FC